Johan Ludvig Runeberg (5 February 1804 – 6 May 1877) was a Finnish priest, lyric and epic poet. He wrote exclusively in Swedish. He is considered a national poet of Finland. Runeberg was also involved in the modernization of the Finnish Lutheran hymnal and produced many texts for the new edition.

Background

Childhood 
Runeberg was born into a Swedish-speaking family in Jakobstad, Finland, on the shores of the Gulf of Bothnia. His parents were sea captain Lorentz Ulrik Runeberg (1772–1828) and Anna Maria Malm (1782–1834). Paternal grandfather Ludvig had moved to Finland from Sweden, and Anna Maria Malm was born to the merchant family from Jakobstad, which probably also had their roots in Sweden.

As a child, Runeberg suffered from scrofula, which led to glandular swelling. His physical development slowed down due to illness so that he did not learn to walk until he was three or four years old. From his father, Johan inherited a manly and brisk character, and from his mother, he inherited sensitivity and artistic talent.

Education 
At the age of eight, Runeberg was sent to live with his uncle and attend school in Oulu.  Runeberg studied in the city of Vaasa and later on at the Imperial Academy of Turku, where he befriended Johan Vilhelm Snellman and Zacharias Topelius. His studies concentrated mainly on the classical languages of Latin and Greek. He earned a Master of Philosophy during 1827. He served as a tutor (1822–1826), docent at the Imperial Alexander University (1830) and teacher at the Swedish-language Helsingfors Lyceum (1831–1836). From 1837 he lived in Porvoo, where he served as professor of Latin literature in the Borgå gymnasium. Runeberg was the tutor of Carl Henrik Alopaeus, who would later become the bishop of Porvoo and an educator of the deaf. Runeberg also supported Carl Oscar Malm's school for the deaf in Porvoo (which Alopaeus taught at) as well as serving on its school board. Finnish salon hostess Natalia Castrén (1830–1881) was a member of Runeberg's cultural circle.

Poetry
Many of his poems deal with life in rural Finland. Three times, a frosty night destroys his crops. Every time, he mixes double the amount of bark into his bark bread to stave off starvation and works ever harder to dry off marsh into dryer land that would not be as exposed to the night frost. After the fourth year, Paavo finally gets a rich crop. As his wife exults, thanks God and tells Paavo to enjoy full bread made entirely out of grain, Paavo instructs his wife to mix bark into grain once more, because their neighbour's crop has been lost in a frost and he gives half of his crop to the needy neighbour.

Selected works
Runeberg's main works included the idealist poem "" (Elk Hunters, 1832) and the epic  (King Fjalar, 1844). The heroic poem  (The Tales of Ensign Stål,  in Finnish) written between 1848 and 1860 is considered the greatest Finnish epic poem outside the native Kalevala tradition and contains tales of the Finnish War of 1808–09 with Russia. In the war, Sweden ignominiously lost Finland, which became a Grand Duchy in the Russian Empire. The epic, which is composed episodically, emphasizes the common humanity of all sides in the conflict, while principally lauding the heroism of the Finns. The first poem  (Our Land, Maamme in Finnish) became the Finnish National Anthem.

Personal life
He was married to his second cousin Fredrika Runeberg, née Tengström, who wrote poems and novels. They were the parents of eight children, including the sculptor Walter Runeberg, who was their eldest son. He also had several emotional affairs throughout his life, most notably with Maria Prytz and the younger poet Emilie Björkstén.

Legacy 

Runeberg Day is celebrated annually on 5 February, the day of Runeberg's birth.  A pastry flavored with almonds called Runeberg's torte is generally available in stores from the beginning of January until 5 February.

There is a statue of Johan Ludwig Runeberg by his son Walter Runeberg on Esplanadi in the heart of Helsinki. Runeberg Township in Becker County, Minnesota was also named after Runeberg.

The Runeberginkatu street in central Helsinki is named after him.

Runeberg was selected as the main motif of the Finnish commemorative coin, the €10 Johan Ludvig Runeberg and Finnish Poetry commemorative coin. It was minted in 2004 celebrating the 200th anniversary of his birth. The obverse of the coin features a stylized portrait of Runeberg's face. The reverse features an 1831 font sample from the Swedish-language newspaper , since Runeberg wrote most of his work in Swedish.

See also

 List of Swedish-language writers
 MS J. L. Runeberg
 Project Runeberg
 Runeberg Prize
 Runeberg torte
 Sven Dufva

References

External links 
Vårt land (Maamme)
Works by Runeberg at Project Runeberg
Johan Ludvig Runeberg at Swedish Wikisource

Recipe for Runeberg Torte (Finnish: Runebergintorttu; Swedish: Runebergstårta)
Runeberg translations by Charles Wharton Stork, pp. 56–80
Anthology of Swedish lyrics from 1750 to 1915 at the Internet Archive
 

1804 births
1877 deaths
19th-century Lutherans
People from Jakobstad
Writers from Ostrobothnia (region)
Finnish Lutherans
Finnish poets in Swedish
Finnish writers in Swedish
Finnish Lutheran hymnwriters
Swedish Lutheran hymnwriters
Lutheran poets
Lutheran writers
National anthem writers
National symbols of Finland
Swedish-speaking Finns